George Michael Ward Jr. (born October 4, 1965), often known by his nickname, "Irish" Micky Ward, is an American former professional boxer who competed from 1985 to 2003. He challenged once for the IBF light welterweight title in 1997, and held the WBU light welterweight title in 2000. Ward is widely known for his trilogy of fights with Arturo Gatti, two of which received Fight of the Year awards by The Ring magazine, as well as his relentless pressure fighting style. Ward was portrayed by Mark Wahlberg in the 2010 film The Fighter, which was based on his early career.

Ancestry

His maternal great-grandmother Annie Greenhalge (Carroll) was born in Ireland, the daughter of Michael and Mary (Flood) Carroll. His maternal great-great-great grandparents Peter McMahon and Ann Quinn were from County Tyrone, Ireland. They fled Ireland during the 1850s to escape from poverty and oppression and arrived in Boston, Massachusetts. They settled in the Acre neighborhood of Lowell, Massachusetts and worked as laborers and millworkers.

Career
Ward was a three-time New England Golden Gloves champion boxer who turned pro in 1985, winning his first fourteen fights. However, his career leveled off, and after losing four consecutive fights in 1990/91, Ward took a hiatus from boxing. During Ward's time away from the sport, he used some of the funds from his day job on a road-paving crew to have surgery on his right hand, which had given him problems during several bouts. The surgery used some of the bone from Ward's pelvis to strengthen and fuse the bones in his hand.

Ward was successful in his return, winning his first nine fights, and won the WBU's Intercontinental Light Welterweight Title in a fight against Shea Neary in 2000. He never defended the belt once.

In a 1997 match that would come to typify the exceptional power of Ward's left hook to the body, he scored a 7th-round knockout against the then-undefeated Mexican Alfonso Sanchez in a fight that Ward, up to then, was clearly losing on points. Shortly before the punch, Emanuel Augustus said the fight should be stopped (which referee Mitch Halpern had threatened to do if Ward didn't "show [him] something"); afterwards Merchant called it one of the most extraordinary things he'd ever seen in boxing.

Ward's left hook to the body later resulted in a first-round knockout of Steve Quinonez, and a nine-count knockdown of Arturo Gatti in their first fight.

Ward earned a 1997 IBF Light Welterweight Championship fight against champion Vince Phillips, but did not win the championship, as the fight was stopped in the third round due to cuts, and Phillips was awarded the bout via TKO. One year later, Ward again would come up short in a title fight, as he lost a 12-round decision against Zab Judah.

In 2000, Ward traveled to London to take on the WBU Light Welterweight Champion,  Shea Neary,  and earned a TKO in the eighth round to win the WBU title. Ward, however, never defended the title, and split his next four fights. His ten-round decision victory over Emanuel Augustus (then known as Emanuel Burton) was voted The Ring magazine's 2001 Fight of the Year.

Ward vs. Gatti trilogy
On May 18, 2002, Ward faced the opponent with whom he became most identified, Arturo Gatti. The fight was a wild one, but a ninth round Ward knockdown of Gatti proved to be the difference, with Ward winning a majority decision. The fight was later named the 2002 Ring magazine fight of the year. Both fighters needed care in a trauma center after the match.

The two agreed to an immediate rematch, and in November, Gatti was able to win the second wild fight, knocking Ward down in the third round, although he survived to finish the fight. Gatti paid tribute to Ward's tenacity after the fight, saying, "I used to wonder what would happen if I fought my twin. Now I know."

They then agreed to a third straight fight, and again, the fight was back and forth. Gatti pounded Ward with punch after punch early on, but Ward fought back and managed a sixth round knockdown of Gatti. Before Gatti could get up, or the referee's count could hit ten, the bell sounded to end the round. Gatti was able to come back and win the fight via a unanimous decision. Again, both men needed a trip to the hospital, due to the injuries they suffered. The fight was named the 2003 Ring magazine fight of the year, the third straight for Ward. Ward was the first fighter to achieve this since Rocky Marciano and Carmen Basilio each did so in the 1950s.

Ward made approximately $3 million in earnings for his trilogy with Gatti; the most lucrative fights of his career.

Life after boxing
Ward still lives in Lowell, where he is part owner of both a boxing gym as well as an outdoor hockey rink. Ward is married to Charlene Fleming, his longtime girlfriend, who is also a former athlete. He manages the boxing gym he owns with his half-brother and former trainer, Dicky Eklund, who trains new boxers entering its academy.

In his 2012 autobiography, Ward revealed that he had been sexually abused as a child by a friend of Dicky's, another boxer referred to only by his nickname, "Hammer". The abuse began when Ward was nine years old and continued for approximately three years, until he gained the confidence to confront his attacker. Ward would eventually face off against Hammer in one of his first amateur bouts, winning by unanimous decision.

In popular culture
The story of Ward's comeback and rise to fame was made into a 2010 feature film, The Fighter, starring Mark Wahlberg (who was nominated for the Golden Globe for Best Actor) as Ward.  In 2011, Wahlberg confirmed to Spike TV that The Fighter 2 is in the works, which will focus on the legendary fight trilogy between Ward and Arturo Gatti.

Lowell hip hop artist D-Tension released the song, '’One Hit to the Body'’ which Micky used as his ring entrance music for the On May 18, 2002 Ward-Gatti bout. 

Philadelphia hip hop group Jedi Mind Tricks released two remixes to their single, Animal Rap from their third album Visions of Gandhi (2003), dubbed the "Micky Ward Mix" and "Arturo Gatti Mix".

The album The Warrior's Code by Dropkick Murphys features Ward on the cover, and he is also the subject of the title song. A live recording of the song is heard in The Fighter.

The game Fight Night Round 3 (2006) features Ward and Gatti on the cover (PS2 and Xbox versions only).

Professional boxing record

References

Further reading
Halloran, Bob. Irish Thunder: The Hard Life & Times of Micky Ward  (Lyons Press, 2010) 
Cooley, Will.  "'Vanilla Thrillas': Modern Boxing and White-Ethnic Masculinity," Journal of Sport and Social Issues 34:4 (November, 2010), 418–437.
Raspanti, John J. and Taylor, Dennis. "Intimate Warfare: The True Story of the Arturo Gatti vs. Micky Ward Boxing Trilogy" [Rowman and Littlefield], (2016.)

External links

Team Micky Ward Charities

1965 births
Living people
Sportspeople from Lowell, Massachusetts
American people of Irish descent
American male boxers
Light-welterweight boxers